KdF may refer to:

 German school of fencing (Kunst des Fechtens), a historical system of combat taught in the Holy Roman Empire
 Kraft durch Freude (Strength Through Joy), a large state-operated leisure organization in Nazi Germany

See also
 KDF (disambiguation)